The hijacking of Southern Airways Flight 49 started on November 10, 1972 in Birmingham, Alabama, stretching over 30 hours, three countries, and , not ending until the next evening in Havana, Cuba. Three men, Melvin Cale, Louis Moore, and Henry D. Jackson Jr. successfully hijacked a Southern Airways Douglas DC-9 that was scheduled to fly from Memphis, Tennessee to Miami, Florida via Birmingham and Montgomery, Alabama and Orlando, Florida.  The three were each facing criminal charges for unrelated incidents. Thirty-four people, including thirty-one passengers and three crew members, were aboard the airplane when it was hijacked. The hijackers' threat to crash the aircraft into a nuclear reactor led directly to the requirement that U.S. airline passengers be physically screened, beginning January 5, 1973.

Hijacking and ransom demands 
Shortly after takeoff from Birmingham after 7:20 pm on Friday, November 10, 1972, en route to Montgomery on a series of scheduled stops in Alabama and Florida, the three hijackers brandished handguns and hand grenades and took over the aircraft, demanding a ransom of $10 million. The hijackers had the plane flown to multiple locations in the United States and Canada, including Cleveland, Ohio; Detroit, Michigan; Lexington, Kentucky; and Toronto, Ontario; while the hijackers figured out their demands before finally arriving in Cuba. At one point, the hijackers threatened to fly the plane into a nuclear research reactor, the High Flux Isotope Reactor at the Oak Ridge National Laboratory, if their demands for $10 million in cash were not met; one hijacker announced "I'm not playing.  If you do not get that money together, I'm gonna crash this plane in Oak Ridge." While over Oak Ridge, Tennessee, the hijackers negotiated with numerous officials, including FBI officials, who only managed to get between $2 million and $2.5 million of ransom money. The plane later landed at Chattanooga, Tennessee's Lovell Field inbound from Knoxville, Tennessee's McGhee Tyson Airport to pick up the ransom. After picking up the less-than-demanded ransom money, the plane took off, bound for Havana. The hijackers passed out some of the ransom money to the passengers. Contrary to the hijackers' expectations, Cuban leader Fidel Castro did not accept them into that country; thus the hijackers had the airplane flown to Orlando, Florida and discussed flying to Algeria (which was not possible due to the airplane's limited range). This marked the first time a hijacked airplane had left Cuba with the hijackers on board. While stopped for refueling at the Orlando Jetport at McCoy, the civilian commercial air terminal at McCoy Air Force Base, the joint civil-military airfield in Orlando, the FBI shot out two of the airplane's four main tires, prompting the hijackers to shoot co-pilot Harold Johnson in the arm and force pilot William Haas to take off.

Capture and aftermath 

Multiple sources alleged the runway was covered in foam at the time of the landing, a claim the plane’s co-pilot has denied. The hijackers were removed from the airplane at gunpoint by Cuban authorities and captured after attempting to escape. The hijackers served eight years in a Cuban prison before returning to the US to serve additional 20–25 year prison sentences. Cuba returned the airplane, crew, passengers, and ransom money to the United States. The incident led to a brief treaty between the U.S. and Cuba to extradite hijackers, which has not since been renewed.

The hijacking was the subject of the National Geographic I Am Rebel documentary series premiere episode "Jacked" by Lana Wilson which aired June 5, 2016.

See also
TWA Flight 106
List of Cuba-United States aircraft hijackings

References
 Reader's Digest (1983). People In Peril and How They Survived. We're Taking Over This Plane and We're Not Gonna Have Any Heroes!
 Nuclear Afternoon: True Stories of Atomic Disasters (2007) Chapter 5 "Skyjacking"

Aircraft hijackings in the United States
Airliner accidents and incidents in the United States
Aviation accidents and incidents in the United States in 1972
Cuba–United States relations
1972 in Cuba
Aircraft hijackings
Southern Airways accidents and incidents
November 1972 events in North America
Terrorist incidents in the United States in 1972
November 1972 events in the United States
Accidents and incidents involving the McDonnell Douglas DC-9